}}

The 2017–18 FC Nantes season was the 74th professional season of the club since its creation in 1943, and the club's 14th consecutive season in the top flight of French football. It covers a period from 1 July 2017 to 30 June 2018. They participated in the Ligue 1, the Coupe de France and Coupe de la Ligue.

Players

Out on loan

Competitions

Overall

Ligue 1

League table

Results summary

Results by round

Matches

Coupe de France

Coupe de la Ligue

References

FC Nantes seasons
Nantes